Mridula may refer to:

Mridula (film), 1990 Malayalam film.
Mridula Garg, Indian writer.
Mridula Sarabhai, Indian Freedom Fighter and activist.
Mridula Sinha, Hindi writer and former chairperson of the Central Social Welfare Board.
Mridula Koshy, Indian writer.
Mridula Warrier, Indian singer.